The 1953 Delaware State Hornets football team represented Delaware State College—now known as Delaware State University—as a member of the Central Intercollegiate Athletic Association (CIAA) in the 1953 college football season. 1930s coach Edward Jackson returned, bringing the team back from a 1–7 record in 1952, to a 4–4 record in 1953. In the last game of the season, the 1934 championship team, who Jackson coached, watched the Hornets win, 19–12.

Schedule

References

Delaware State
Delaware State Hornets football seasons
Delaware State Hornets football